Tōshōin (洞松院, born in the 1460s) or Akamatsu Tōshōin was a Japanese noble who acted as the power behind the throne or de facto daimyo of the Akamatsu clan during the Sengoku period. She was the daughter of Hosokawa Katsumoto, sister of Hosokawa Masamoto, and wife of Akamatsu Masanori. Tōshōin was a de facto Daimyo who supported the Akamatsu clan as a guardian of Akamatsu Yoshimura. She took explicit control of the clan as the leader in 1521, after Yoshimura was assassinated.

See also 
List of female castellans in Japan

References 

1460s births
Year of birth uncertain
Year of death unknown

Keichō-Hosokawa clan

Daimyo
People of Sengoku-period Japan
16th-century women rulers
16th-century women politicians

Japanese women in politics

15th-century Japanese people
15th-century Japanese women
16th-century Japanese people
16th-century Japanese women
Women of medieval Japan
Samurai